Yarabaykul (Yarabaykül) is a rural locality (a village) in Aksyonovsky Selsoviet, Alsheyevsky District, Bashkortostan, Russia. The population was 15 as of 2010. There is 1 street.

Geography 
Yarabaykul is located 36 km southwest of Rayevsky (the district's administrative centre) by road. Chubukaran is the nearest rural locality.

References 

Rural localities in Alsheyevsky District